The U.S. House Energy Subcommittee on Communications and Technology is a subcommittee within the House Committee on Energy and Commerce. The subcommittee existed as the Subcommittee on Communications, Technology and the Internet during the 111th Congress and beyond.

Jurisdiction
The committee has jurisdiction over:
 Interstate and foreign electronic communications, "both Interstate and foreign, including voice, video, audio and data, whether transmitted by wire or wirelessly, and whether transmitted by telecommunications, commercial or private mobile service, broadcast, cable, satellite, microwave, or other mode"
 Technology in general
 The emergency communication system and public safety communications
 "Cybersecurity, privacy, and data security"
 Oversight over:
 Federal Communications Commission
 National Telecommunications and Information Administration
 Office of Emergency Communications in the Department of Homeland Security; and all aspects of the above-referenced jurisdiction related to the Department of Homeland Security.

Members, 118th Congress

Historical membership rosters

117th Congress

116th Congress

115th Congress

Subcommittee activities in 115th Congress 
The subcommittee typically has two types of meetings:
 Hearings, in which subcommittee members discuss specific issues related to proposed legislation or general topics, listen to testimony from a panel of invited guests, and ask the panel questions
 Markups, in which the subcommittee considers specific bills, offers and votes on amendments, and then votes on whether to continue the bills through the legislative process
The following table shows some of the subcommittee's activities held in 2017, as of early March 2017.

References

External links
Official Homepage 

Energy Communications and Technology